Les Maroons de Lachine were a Canadian Junior ice hockey team from Lachine, Quebec, Canada.  It started as a franchise in the Metropolitaine leagues in 1953 in both the Junior A and Junior B divisions.  Later, in 1995, the Pierrefonds Lions of the Quebec Junior A league moved to Lachine and resumed use of the name.

Following the 2014–15 season the Maroon franchise was sold to investors of the Gatineau Mustangs. The Mustangs were former members of the Eastern Ontario Junior B Hockey League. This league re-organized and re-branded itself as the Central Canada Hockey League Tier 2 and eliminated 6 teams, one of which was the Gatineau Mustangs. The re-located Maroons became known as the Gatineau Flames.

Season-by-season record
Note: GP = Games Played, W = Wins, L = Losses, T = Ties, OTL = Overtime Losses, GF = Goals for, GA = Goals against

External links
Maroons Webpage

Ligue de Hockey Junior AAA Quebec teams
Ice hockey teams in Montreal
Lachine, Quebec